Alone Too Long is a solo piano album by Tommy Flanagan.

Recording and music 
The album was recorded on December 8, 1977, at Sound Ideas Studios, New York City. The recording was by Nippon Columbia. The compositions are a mix of standards, other jazz pieces, and three pieces by Flanagan.

Releases
The album was released in Japan in 1977. It was released on CD in the United States by Denon Records in 1978.

Track listing 
"Parisian Thoroughfare" (Bud Powell)
"In Your Own Sweet Way" (Dave Brubeck)
"Like a Butterfly" (Tommy Flanagan)
"Here's That Rainy Day" (Johnny Burke, James Van Heusen)
"Alone Too Long" (Shorty Rogers, Sidney Keith 'Bob' Russell)
"Maybe September" (Ray Evans, Percy Faith, Jay Livingston)
"Strollin (Kenny Clarke)
"Glad to Be Unhappy/No More/That Ole Devil Called Love" (Lorenz Hart, Richard Rodgers)
"Bean and Boys/In Walked Bud" (Coleman Hawkins, Thelonious Monk)
"Ultima Thule" (Flanagan)
"The Very Thought of You" (Ray Noble)
"Dignified Appearance" (Flanagan)

Personnel 
 Tommy Flanagan – piano

References 

1977 albums
Solo piano jazz albums
Tommy Flanagan albums